Đorđe (transliterated Djordje) is a Serbian given name, a Serbian variant, derived from Greek Georgios (George in English). Other variants include: Đurđe, Đurađ, Đura, Đuro, Georgije. It may refer to:

 Đorđe Andrejević Kun (1904–1964), Serbian painter
 Đorđe Babalj (born 1981), Serbian association football player
 Đorđe Balašević (1953–2021), Serbian and former Yugoslav recording artist and singer-songwriter
 Đorđe Bogić (1911–1941), protopresbyter and parish priest in the Serbian Orthodox Church
 Đorđe Čotra (born 1984), Serbian association football player
 Đorđe Denić (born 1996), Serbian association football player
 Djordje Djokovic (Đorđe Đoković, born 1995), Serbian tennis player
 Đorđe Ivelja (born 1984), Serbian association football player
 Đorđe Jokić (born 1981), Serbian association football player
 Đorđe Jovanović (1861–1953), Serbian sculptor
 Đorđe Kamber (born 1983), Bosnian-Herzegovinian association football player
 Đorđe Krstić (1851–1907), Serbian realist painter
 Đorđe Lavrnić (1946–2010), Yugoslav/Serbian handball player
 Đorđe Lazić (footballer) (born 1983), Serbian association football player
 Đorđe Lazić (water polo) (born 1996), Serbian water polo player
 Đorđe Milić (born 1943), Yugoslav football manager and former player
 Đorđe Marjanović (1931–2021), Serbian and Yugoslav singer
 Đorđe Mitrofanović ( 1550– 1630), Serbian Orthodox monk and painter
 Đorđe Nemanjić ( 1208–1243), Serbian Grand Prince
 Đorđe Novković (1943–2007), songwriter known for his work in SFR Yugoslavia and Croatia
 Đorđe Pantić (born 1980), Serbian association football player
 Đorđe Pavlić (1938–2015), Serbian association football player
 Đorđe Prudnikov (1939–2017), Russo-Serbian painter, graphic artist, and designer
 Đorđe Rakić (born 1985), Serbian association football player
 Djordje Stijepovic (Đorđe Stijepović, born 1977), Serbian-American double bass player, singer, and composer
 Đorđe Svetličić (born 1974), Serbian association football player
 Đorđe Tomić (born 1972), Serbian association football player
 Đorđe Tutorić (born 1983), Serbian association football player
 Đorđe Vlajić (born 1977), Serbian association football manager and former player
 Đorđe Vujkov (born 1955), Yugoslav/Serbian association football player

See also
 Đorđević, a surname
 Đorđić, a surname

Bosnian masculine given names
Serbian masculine given names